James Langrishe (c.1765 – 17 May 1847) was Dean of Achonry from 1791 until 1806 when he became Archdeacon of Glendalough. He was also rector of Newcastle Lyons, co. Dublin, and Killishin, County Carlow.

He was the second son of Sir Hercules Langrishe, 1st Baronet of Knocktopher, County Kilkenny, Ireland, an MP in the Parliament of Ireland, and a noted supporter of 
Catholic Emancipation, and his wife Hannah Myhill of Killerney,   County Kilkenny.

He died aged 82 in 1847 and was buried at St Finian's Church, Newcastle, County Dublin. He had married Mary Harriet Michel. Their son was Charles Tottenham Langrishe (named for the 1st Marquess of Ely, who married James' aunt Jane Myhill) and their daughter Margaret Langrishe.

References

Charles Strong (priest)

1847 deaths
Alumni of Trinity College Dublin
Irish Anglicans
Deans of Achonry
Archdeacons of Glendalough
James
Younger sons of baronets
Year of birth uncertain